Hugh Fraser, 5th Lord Lovat (c. 1545–1577) was a Scottish landowner.

He was the son of Alexander Fraser, 4th Lord Lovat (d. 1557) and Janet Campell, a daughter of John Campbell of Cawdor. He was known as "Red Hugh" from the colour of his hair.

After his father died in 1557 his estates were managed for a time by his uncle, William Fraser of Struy, Tutor of Lovat, and he was educated by monks at Beauly Priory. In May 1562 the Tutor of Lovat and young Lord Hugh came to Inverness to meet Mary, Queen of Scots with 400 followers. His grandmother Janet Ross told Mary that she had met her mother Mary of Guise there (in 1556).

He went to  Edinburgh in 1569 and made friends with Regent Moray, who he welcomed at Inverness in May 1569. Lovat attended the Convention of the Estates at Perth in July 1569.

According to the 17th-century family historian, James Fraser, Lovat enjoyed archery, football, horse racing, and tilting, meeting other landowners including John Grant at the Chapel yard in Inverness for these sports.

In 1574 he was made captain of Inverness Castle by Regent Morton.

He died at Towie Barclay on 1 January 1577.

Family
He married Elizabeth Stewart, daughter of John Stewart, 4th Earl of Atholl and Elizabeth Gordon. Their children included:
 Alexander Fraser, who married the daughter of the Laird of Moniak
 Simon Fraser, 6th Lord Lovat, who married Jean Stewart, daughter of James Stewart, 1st Lord Doune and Margaret Campbell, a lady in waiting to Anne of Denmark.
 Anna Fraser, who married Hector Munro of Foulis
 Mary or Margaret Fraser, who married James Cumming of Altyre

References

Lords of Parliament (pre-1707)
Hugh
16th-century Scottish people
Clan Fraser Chiefs
1540s births
1577 deaths
Year of birth uncertain